The New Zealand sprat (Sprattus muelleri) is a herring-like, marine fish in the family Clupeidae found in the subtropical southwest Pacific Ocean endemic to New Zealand. It belongs to a genus Sprattus of small oily fish, usually known by their common name, sprats.

Its depth range is from the surface to 110 m, and its length is up to 13 cm.

See also
 New Zealand blueback sprat

References

 

New Zealand sprat
Endemic marine fish of New Zealand
Taxa named by Carl Benjamin Klunzinger
New Zealand sprat